A moveable feast is an observance in a Christian liturgical calendar which  occurs on different dates in different years.

Spring paschal feasts
Often considered the most important Christian observance, Spring paschal feasts are a fixed number of days before or after Easter Sunday, which varies by 35 days since it depends partly on the phase of the moon and must be computed each year.  In the Hebrew calendar, the new moon of Aviv, spring, is fixed as the Lunar New Year, and the month is called Nisan.  The 14 of Nisan is the paschal full moon, the day of the Pesach seder, a ritual meal telling the story of the Exodus from Egypt.  It is one of the three pilgrimage festivals incumbent on all Jewish males living in the land of Israel.  For this observance of this mitzvah, commandment, Jesus and the disciples went to Jerusalem, and held a festive meal on Passover night, which would be Last Supper.

Quartodeciman Christians continued to end the Lenten fast in time to observe the Passover (Christian), which occurs before the Lord's day, as the two are not mutually exclusive.  However, due to intense persecution from Nicene Christianity after the Easter controversy, the practice had mostly died out by the 5th or 6th century, and only re-emerged in the 20th century.

In Eastern Christianity (including the Eastern Orthodox Church, the Oriental Orthodox Churches, the Assyrian Church of the East, and the Eastern Catholic Churches), these moveable feasts form what is called the Paschal cycle, which stands in contrast to the approach taken by Catholic and Protestant Christianity.

Pentecost

Moveable solemnities

Not all observances are feasts, and among those that are moveable is the Lenten fast, which is held for the 40 days prior to Easter.

Relationship to solar fixed feasts
Most other feast days, such as those of particular saints, are fixed feasts, held on the same date every year. However, some observances are always held on the same day of the week, and thus occur on a range of days without depending on the date of Easter. For example, the start of Advent is the Sunday nearest November 30. In addition, the observance of some fixed feasts may move a few days in a particular year to not clash with that year's date for a more important moveable feast. There are rare examples of saints with genuinely moveable feast days, such as Saint Sarkis the Warrior in the calendar of the Armenian Church.

See also

Liturgical year
Movable Eastern Christian observances
Movable Western Christian observances

In other religions
The Chinese calendar, like the Hebrew calendar, is lunisolar.  Therefore Chinese New Year and Mid-Autumn Festival are moveable.

Since Islamic feasts (Eid al-Adha and Eid al-Fitr) are lunar month based, they take place in different solar calendar dates and can occur at any time of the year, relative to the Roman civil calendar which is solar.  Unlike the lunisolar Hebrew, Chinese, and Babylonian calendars, which intercalate a leap month every 2 or 3 years to fix the month of spring, Islamic months can occur at any time of the year, and thus are referred to as "strictly lunar".

In the Jewish religion there are two ritual observances that are seasonal and which therefore have no fixed dates in the Jewish calendar, whose months are lunar. Their occurrences are regulated by the Shmuelian tekufot of the Jewish calendar, which are calendric approximations of the equinoxes and solstices, designed by Samuel of Nehardea, to make those two observances fall on consistent dates of the Julian calendar. They are: (a) the annual commencement, for diaspora Jewry, of the sh'elah period, during which a petition for rain is added to the daily prayers, and (b) the recital of the Birkat Hachama (blessing of the Sun), a ceremony performed once every 28 years. The former always begins on 23 November, Julian, or 24 November when the following year is a Julian leap year. The latter always occurs on 26 March, Julian, in a Julian year of the form 28n+21, which is always a Wednesday.

References

External links
A table of moveable feasts with dates, published by the Church of England.
"Why Some Feasts Are Moveable", a Slate article
"How the dates of moveable feasts are calculated, then and now", translated from the Latin by Michael Deckers.

Religious holidays
Catholic liturgy
Islamic holy days